The Petition to the King was a petition sent to King George III by the First Continental Congress in 1774, calling for the repeal of the Intolerable Acts. The King's rejection of the Petition, was one of the causes of the later United States Declaration of Independence and American Revolutionary War.  The Continental Congress had hoped to resolve conflict without a war.

Political background
Following the end of the French and Indian War (the North American theater of the Seven Years' War) in 1763, relations between the colonies and Britain had been deteriorating. Because the war had plunged the British government deep into debt, Parliament enacted a series of measures to increase tax revenue from the colonies. These acts, such as the Stamp Act of 1765 and the Townshend Acts of 1767, were seen as legitimate means of collecting revenues to pay off the nearly two-fold increase in British debt stemming from the war.

Many colonists in the Americas, however, developed a different conception of their role within the British Empire. In particular, because the colonies were not directly represented in Parliament, colonists argued that Parliament had no right to levy taxes upon them. After colonists destroyed thousands of pounds of British-taxed tea during the Boston Tea Party, Parliament passed the Coercive Acts in 1774, punishing the colonies for their actions. These punitive Acts were vehemently opposed by the colonists, leading the newly formed Continental Congress to seek redress with King George III, in an attempt to reach a common understanding.

Development of the document

Conception

On October 1, 1774, in response to the deteriorating relationship between the American Colonies and Britain, the First Continental Congress decided to prepare a statement to King George III of Great Britain. The goal of the address was to persuade the King to revoke unpopular policies such as the Coercive Acts, which were imposed on the Colonies by the British Parliament. The committee appointed to prepare the Address consisted of Richard Henry Lee, John Adams, Thomas Johnson, Patrick Henry, and John Rutledge, with Lee designated as the committee chairman.

On October 5, 1774, Congress once more returned to the subject of the Address, stressing to the committee that the document should assure the King that following the successful repeal of the Coercive Acts, the Colonies would restore favorable relations with Britain.

Approval by Congress

On October 25, 1774, the petition came before Congress in its draft form. After the document was debated over and formally amended, it was then approved to be engrossed and sent to England to be presented to the King.

Annotated text of the petition
The petition, when written, was not divided into formal parts. However, the structure of the document allows it to be classified into sections, including an introduction, the list of grievances, reasons for attention, and a conclusion.

Delivery of the document
On November 2, the petition departed Philadelphia on board the ship Britannia, captained by W. Morwick. However, a storm forced the ship to return to port, delaying the delivery of the petition. It was later discovered that the paper was unfit to be presented. The second copy left port on November 6 on board the ship Mary and Elizabeth, captained by N. Falconer. It was confirmed on December 14 that the document successfully arrived in London.

In Britain, a number of London merchants expressed interest in joining the Americans when the petition was presented, although Benjamin Franklin advised against the proposition. On December 21, Benjamin Franklin, Lee, and Bollan were notified by Lord Dartmouth that the petition was "decent and respectful" and that it would be presented as soon as possible to the Houses of Parliament. However, Franklin wrote two days later that the petition could not be presented to Parliament until after the Christmas recess.

Response
On January 19, 1775, the petition was presented to the House of Commons by Lord North, and was also presented to the House of Lords the following day.

Because the petition was intermingled with many other documents, and given the increasing turmoil of the times, little attention was given to the petition by Parliament. Likewise, the King never gave the Colonies a formal reply to their petition.

Publication
When the official papers of Congress were published in October and November 1774, the Petition to the King was omitted, because it was preferred that the address be read by the King before being made public. It was not until January 17 or 18, 1775 that the papers were officially released by the secretary of the Continental Congress, Founding Father Charles Thomson, for publication.

Surviving drafts
Three drafts of the Petition to the King still survive: one written by Patrick Henry, one written by Richard Henry Lee, and one by John Dickinson.

Patrick Henry
The Henry draft is written with very few corrections on its four portfolio pages. Compared to the final version of the Address, the draft contains more rhetorical descriptions of the contested Acts, and focuses less on the Colonies' past loyalty to Britain.

Richard Henry Lee
The Lee draft is neatly written, with minor changes, on three portfolio pages. Compared to the Henry draft, the descriptions of the grievances were brief. It does contain, however, a harsh attack on the King's ministers, most notably Bute, Mansfield, and North. Because of the inflammatory language in this draft, it is argued that this is the version that was rejected by Congress on October 21, 1774.

John Dickinson
The Dickinson draft is a rough composition, rite with many changes, including entire paragraphs designated to be transposed. The document is nine and a half portfolio pages, numbered 1-9 and 12, with pages 10 and 11 left blank. The text found in this draft is virtually identical to the document adopted by Congress, with the main difference lying in the list of grievances in the adopted version, which resembled those found in the other two drafts.

Historical significance
The Petition to the King reflected the Colonies' desire to maintain relations with Britain, given that certain demands were met. In particular, it showed that the Colonies viewed themselves as loyal to the British monarchy rather than to Parliament.

See also
 Founding Fathers of the United States
 Journals of the Continental Congress

Notes

References

1774 in the Thirteen Colonies
Ordinances of the Continental Congress
Documents of the American Revolution
Petitions
1774 in international relations
George III of the United Kingdom
1774 documents